Georgios Ioannou Rallis (26 December 1918 – 15 March 2006), anglicised to George Rallis, was a Greek conservative politician and the 2nd Prime Minister of Greece from 1980 to 1981.

Ancestors in politics 

Georgios was descended from the old, noble and political Rallis family. Alexandros Rallis, born in 1760, was a prominent Phanariote (Greek from Constantinople). In 1849 his son  became Chief Justice of the Greek Supreme Court. Dimitrios Rallis, paternal grandfather of Georgios Rallis, served as Prime Minister of Greece for five separate short periods in 1897, 1903, 1905, 1909 and 1921. Dimitrios' son and Georgios' father, Ioannis Rallis, was a collaborationist Prime Minister from 1943 to 1944, during the German occupation. After the liberation of Greece he was sentenced to life imprisonment for collaboration and died in jail in 1946. His maternal grandfather, Georgios Theotokis, was four times Prime Minister of Greece, between 1901 and 1907.

Early life 
Georgios Rallis was born on 26 December 1918 in the prestigious Kolonaki district of Athens.

He studied law and political sciences at the University of Athens. Shortly after graduating he joined the fight against fascist Italy after the italian invasion on 28 October 1940 as a cavalry Second Lieutenant of the Reserve. He was recalled to active service during the Greek Civil War of 1946–49, during which he served in the armoured corps.

Political career 
Rallis was first elected to the Greek Parliament as a member of the People's Party in the 1950 general election, and was re-elected in all subsequent elections until the end of his political career in 1993, except the 1958 election and the June 1989 election, where he did not run. He was first appointed a cabinet minister on 11 April 1954 in the government of Alexander Papagos, as Minister for the Presidency of the Government.

A close collaborator of Constantine Karamanlis, he retained the position under the first Karamanlis cabinet (6 October 1955 – 29 February 1956), and went on to serve as Minister for Transport and Public Works in the 1956–58 Karamanlis cabinet, and as Minister for the Interior in the 1961–1963 Karamanlis cabinet. He was also among the founding members of the National Radical Union (ERE) in 1956. In 1958, he quarrelled with Karamanlis over the latter's adoption of a new electoral law, on which he had not been consulted, and for a few years left ERE, before returning to the fold in 1961.

Rallis was appointed to the post of Minister for Public Order in the caretaker cabinet of Panagiotis Kanellopoulos on 3 April 1967. It was in this position that the coup d'état of the Colonels found him on 21 April 1967. Rallis managed to evade capture by the putschists and go to the command centre of the Greek Gendarmerie, from where by radio he tried in vain to get in contact with the III Army Corps and order it to descend onto Athens and suppress the coup. Following the establishment of the Junta of the Colonels, he was arrested thrice, imprisoned and sent to internal exile to the island of Kasos. Among his anti-regime activities were his campaigning against the Junta-sponsored Republic referendum of 1973, and his criticism of the regime through his editorship of the magazine Politika Themata.

In 1974, following the fall of the dictatorship, Rallis became briefly Minister for the Interior and then again Minister to the Prime Minister in the national unity government under Karamanlis, and held on to the post (from 2 January 1975 as Minister for the Presidency of the Government) under the government formed by Karamanlis' new party, New Democracy, after the November 1974 election. On 5 January 1976 he also assumed the post of Minister for National Education and Religious Affairs, which he held in tandem with the former post until the end of the cabinet term on 28 November 1977. From the post of Minister for Education he oversaw the educational reform, the institution of the Demotic Greek as the formal language in schools and the administration, replacing the Katharevousa, and the reform of the school curricula.

Following the 1977 election, he served first as Minister for Coordination, before becoming Minister for Foreign Affairs in May 1978. He was the first Greek Foreign Minister to visit the Soviet Union, in October 1978, and negotiated Greece's accession to the EEC, signing Greece's accession agreement in May 1979. He also worked to restore relations with Bulgaria and Yugoslavia.

After Karamanlis was elected to the post of President of the Republic, on 8 May 1980 Rallis was elected by New Democracy's parliamentary group as the new party chairman, and was sworn in as Prime Minister on 10 May. During his tenure Greece rejoined the military wing of NATO.

He led the government until his defeat by Andreas Papandreou's PASOK in the 18 October 1981 election, resigning on 21 October. Shortly after, in early December, having lost the confidence of his party's MPs, he resigned from the chairmanship of New Democracy.

In May 1987 he split from New Democracy and became an independent MP. He did not participate in the June 1989 election, but after a personal invitation by the new New Democracy chairman, Konstantinos Mitsotakis, he rejoined the party and was elected an MP for Corfu. After a renewed dispute with Mitsotakis, now Prime Minister, over the handling of the Macedonia naming dispute, he resigned from his post and retired from politics in March 1993. During his retirement, Rallis established and cultivated organically-farmed vineyards and olive groves at his family estate on Corfu.

Although Rallis became Prime Minister at a time when the fortunes of his party were in decline, he remained a popular figure because of his well-liked personal attributes of mildness, modesty and straightforwardness. A wealthy patrician by birth, he always made a point of living modestly, walking to work (even as a Prime Minister, much to the frustration of his security detail), and taking the time to greet and talk with those he met on the street. He died of heart failure at his home on 15 March 2006. He is survived by his wife, Lena Rallis (née Voultsou) and their two daughters, Zaira Papaligouras and Joanna Farmakidis.

Rallis spoke English, French, and German, and wrote 14 books.

A bust of Rallis in Corfu was stolen in April 2019.

References

External links
Athens News obituary
1991 interview of Rallis on his career in the 1950s and early 1960s, ERT Archive

|-

|-

|-

|-

|-

1918 births
2006 deaths
20th-century prime ministers of Greece
Children of national leaders
Foreign ministers of Greece
Greek MPs 1950–1951
Greek MPs 1951–1952
Greek MPs 1952–1956
Greek MPs 1956–1958
Greek MPs 1961–1963
Greek MPs 1963–1964
Greek MPs 1964–1967
Greek MPs 1974–1977
Greek MPs 1977–1981
Greek MPs 1981–1985
Greek MPs 1985–1989
Greek MPs 1989–1990
Greek MPs 1990–1993
Greek military personnel of the Greek Civil War
Greek military personnel of World War II
Greek prisoners and detainees
Greek Rally politicians
Leaders of New Democracy (Greece)
Ministers of the Interior of Greece
National and Kapodistrian University of Athens alumni
National Radical Union politicians
People from Athens
Politicians from Athens
People's Party (Greece) politicians
Prime Ministers of Greece
Georgios
Resistance to the Greek junta